Alamo Heights High School is a public high school located in the city of Alamo Heights, Texas and is the only high school in the Alamo Heights Independent School District.

Athletics
The Alamo Heights Mules compete in the following sports:

Cheerleading, Volleyball, Cross Country, Football, Basketball, Swimming, Diving, Water Polo, Soccer, Golf, Tennis, Track, Baseball & Softball.

State Titles
Boys Basketball  - 
1952(3A), 1954(3A)
Football - 
2006(4A/D1)
Boys Golf - 
1950(City), 1956(2A), 1963(4A), 1964(4A), 1965(4A), 1968(4A), 1970(4A)
Boys Soccer - 
1987(All), 2012(4A)
Girls Swimming - 
1973(3A), 2014(4A)
Team Tennis - 
1984(4A), 1986(4A), 1987(4A), 1988(4A), 1993(4A), 1994(4A), 1995(4A), 1996(4A), 1998(4A), 1999(4A), 2000(4A),2002(4A)
Cheerleading - 
2016(5A), 2017(5A), 2019(5A), 2020(5A)

Notable alumni 

 Patrick Bailey, class of 2004, former linebacker for the Tennessee Titans and won a Super Bowl with the Pittsburgh Steelers in 2009.
  Angela Belcher, attended, is the Director of the Biomolecular Materials Group at MIT.
 "Tito” Beveridge, class of 1979, is the founder of Tito’s Vodka 
 Marie Brenner, class of 1967, is an author, investigative journalist, and writer-at-large for Vanity Fair magazine.
 William H. Cade, class of 1964, Animal Behaviorist, Othroperist, President Emeritus of the University of Lethbridge.
 Chase Clement, class of 2004, was a quarterback for the Las Vegas Locomotives and won the UFL's 2010 Championship Game taking home the game MVP trophy.
 Christopher Cross, class of 1969, is a recording artist with Top 40 hits including "Sailing" and "Arthur's Theme".
 Light Townsend Cummins, class of 1964, is the official State Historian of Texas.
 Marisol Deluna, class of 1985, is an American fashion designer. 
 Dayna Devon, class of 1988, is a former TV host of the syndicated show- EXTRA.
 Billy Grabarkewitz, class of 1964, former MLB player
 Bette Nesmith Graham, inventor and founder of Liquid Paper
 Robert Hammond, class of 1988, co-founder and the executive director of Friends of the High Line.
 Kara Hultgreen, class of 1983, (D. 1994), first female carrier-based Navy fighter pilot. 
 Davey Johnson, class of 1961, former manager of MLB's Washington Nationals and 3 times World Series winner as coach & players
 Brenda Marshall, actress
 Rick Riordan, class of 1982, is a San Antonio-based novelist of the Tres Navarre mystery series for adults and The New York Times bestselling Percy Jackson series for children.
 Ross Richie, class of 1988, comic book publisher and founder of Boom! Studios.
 Joe Straus, class of 1978, is a former Speaker of the Texas House of Representatives.
 Clay Tarver, class of 1984, co-founder of the bands Chavez (band) and Bullet LaVolta, screenwriter for the movie Joy Ride and Writers Guild of America award-winning Executive Producer of the HBO show Silicon Valley
 Jeff Wentworth, class of 1958, served in the Texas Senate from 1993 to 2013 after tenure in the Texas House of Representatives from 1988 to 1993.
 Peter Weller, class of 1965, is an actor in movies such as RoboCop.
 Forrest Whitley, MLB pitcher with the Houston Astros
 Arthur Barrow, musician, composer, producer, and arranger.  Played with Frank Zappa, Robby Krieger, The Doors among others.  Worked with Giorgio Moroder on Top Gun and other soundtracks.

See also 
 San Antonio Independent School District v. Rodriguez

References

External links 
 Alamo Heights High School

Educational institutions established in 1909
Public high schools in Bexar County, Texas
1909 establishments in Texas